Slobodan Kaličanin (born 27 April 1969) is a Serbian former professional basketball player.

Playing career 
Kaličanin started his basketball career playing with the youth teams of Crvena zvezda. On start of the 1988–89 season he was promoted to the first team. With the Zvezda he won two YUBA League titles (1993 and 1994). Also, he played for Rogaška Donat MG and Elektra Šoštanj (Premier A Slovenian League), the IDE Trading Rotterdam (Dutch League), Genève-Versiox (Swiss League), SSV Ulm 1846 (Basketball Bundesliga) and Nová Huť Ostrava (National League of the Czech Republic).

National team career 
Kaličanin was a member of the Yugoslavia national junior team that won the gold medal at the 1988 European Championship for Juniors in Titov Vrbas, Yugoslavia. Over three tournament games, he averaged 5.3 points per game.

Career achievements 
 Yugoslav League champion: 2 (with Crvena zvezda: 1992–93, 1993–94)
 Yugoslav Super Cup winner: 1 (with Crvena zvezda: 1993)

References

External links
 Profile at eurobasket.com

1969 births
Living people
Basketball players from Belgrade
BK NH Ostrava players
Dutch Basketball League players
Lions de Genève players
KK Crvena zvezda players
KK IMT Beograd players
KK Zastava players
KK Sloga players
KK Sutjeska players
Power forwards (basketball)
Ratiopharm Ulm players
Feyenoord Basketball players
Serbian expatriate basketball people in the Czech Republic
Serbian expatriate basketball people in Germany
Serbian expatriate basketball people in the Netherlands
Serbian expatriate basketball people in Slovenia
Serbian expatriate basketball people in Switzerland
Serbian men's basketball players
Yugoslav men's basketball players